Illinois Route 159 is a north–south state road in southwestern Illinois. Its southern terminus is at Illinois Route 3 and Illinois Route 154 in Red Bud and its northern terminus at Illinois Route 16 in Royal Lakes.

Route description 

Illinois 159 is a major north–south artery through the eastern portion of the metropolitan St. Louis, Missouri area.  Illinois 159 overlaps Illinois Route 143 in Edwardsville.

Widening of a stretch of Illinois 159 to five lanes took place around 2006; the highway is now five lanes from Fairview Heights to Edwardsville, with the exception of downtown Collinsville, where a similar widening project was completed in 2012.

History 
SBI Route 159 ran from Red Bud to Alton. In 1964, the Edwardsville to Alton segment was changed to Illinois Route 143, and Illinois 159 was run north through Edwardsville to Royal Lakes, replacing Illinois Route 112. This created an unusual 3 way multiplex in downtown Edwardsville where you went north on 157, south on 159, and east on 143 for 2 blocks.  This multiplex was not signed, however.  In 2003 Illinois 159 was rerouted through Edwardsville, which eliminated that multiplex.

An Alternate Illinois Route 159 was proposed by Edwardsville on the old Illinois 159 alignment on Troy Road, but was never implemented.

Major intersections

References

External links 
Illinois Highway Ends: Illinois Route 159

159
159
Transportation in Monroe County, Illinois
Transportation in St. Clair County, Illinois
Transportation in Madison County, Illinois
Belleville, Illinois
Edwardsville, Illinois
Transportation in Randolph County, Illinois
Transportation in Macoupin County, Illinois